Zawada  is a village in the administrative district of Gmina Olkusz, within Olkusz County, Lesser Poland Voivodeship, in southern Poland.

The village has a population of 630.

References

Zawada